Pavel Kucherov (born 18 August 1964) is a Russian former footballer. Kucherov was an assistant coach at Dinamo Minsk and later a scout at Arsenal F.C.

Career
Born in August 1964 within Smolensk in what is now Russia, Kucherov started his playing days at 11 years old with side Iskra Smolensk. After eight years there he journeyed to club Skif Smolensk in 1981 where he began his professional career. Then he moved to Temp Orsha, stayed there from 1982-1985. He ended up having a spell at Spartak Oryol and ended his career at Divizion Smolensk 1989 at the age of 25.

Kucherov is of Dutch citizenry as he had a lengthy spell coaching at Eredivisie side Willem II Tilburg He also coached at club FC Karpaty of Ukraine.

References

1964 births
Living people
Sportspeople from Smolensk
Soviet footballers
Association football defenders
FC Oryol players
Russian football managers
Russian expatriate football managers
Expatriate football managers in the Netherlands
Expatriate football managers in Ukraine
Russian expatriate sportspeople in Ukraine
Expatriate football managers in Belarus
Ukrainian Premier League managers
FC Karpaty Lviv managers
FC Naftan Novopolotsk managers
FC Iskra Smolensk players
Willem II (football club) non-playing staff